Hussein Ismail or Husein ismail also known as Ato Hussein Ismail was a Somali Ethiopian politician who held several spots in the Ethiopian government. He is the first Somali to be promoted to a Minister, Ambassador, Commissioner and Politician in Ethiopia to the government of the Coordinating Committee of the Armed Forces, Police, and Territorial Army or simply short the Derg that ruled Ethiopia from 1974 to 1987.

History 
Hussein Ismail was born in Dire Dawa, Ethiopia and belongs to the Afugud or Gibril Muse (Afguduud), Makahil (Makahiil) section of the Gadabursi (Gadabuursi) or Samaron (Samaroon). He served his country as Chief-Administrator of the Illubabor Province in Ethiopia after the fall of Haile Selassie. Furthermore, he became Governor of Dire Dawa, Ambassador to South Yemen, Ambassador to Bulgaria, Ambassador to Cuba and Minister of Education and Commissioner for Pensions and Social Security for Ethiopia. He also was a member of the Central Committee of COPWE (Commission for Organizing the Party of the Working People of Ethiopia). He laid the foundation for Somali inclusiveness into Ethiopia.

Career 
 Governor of Dire Dawa
 Chief-Administrator of Illubabor Province (1974–1976 )
 Minister of Education (August 1976 – 1978)
 Member of the Central Committee of COPWE (1979–1984)
 Commissioner for Pensions and Social Security (1978–1983)
 Ambassador of Ethiopia to South Yemen (1983–1984)
 Ambassador of Ethiopia to Cuba (1984–1986)
 Ambassador of Ethiopia to Bulgaria (1986)

References 

Gadabuursi
Ambassadors of Ethiopia
Education ministers
Government ministers of Ethiopia
People from Dire Dawa
20th-century Ethiopian politicians